Percy Mason (19 November 1873 – 27 November 1952) was an English first-class cricketer active 1896–1901 who played for Nottinghamshire. He was born in East Bridgford; died in Gunthorpe.

References

1873 births
1952 deaths
English cricketers
Nottinghamshire cricketers
Cheshire cricketers